Zaghloul El Naggar ((), his full name is Zaghloul Ragheb Mohammed Al Naggar. Is an Egyptian geologist, Muslim scholar, and author. The main theme of El-Naggar's books has been science in Quran; his philosophy of science is blended with religion. He left his academic career to become the Chairman of Committee of Scientific Notions in the Qur'an, Supreme Council of Islamic Affairs, Cairo, Egypt.

Personal life
He received his bachelor's degree from the University of Cairo. He obtained his PhD in geology from the University of Wales in the United Kingdom in 1963 where his thesis title was "Geology and stratigraphic palaeontology of the Esna-Idfu Region, Nile Valley, Egypt, U.A.R.". El-Naggar is an elected Fellow of the Islamic Academy of Sciences (1988), the Geological Society of Egypt and the American Association of Petroleum Geologists, Tulsa, Oklahoma. He was imprisoned because of his political activism and beliefs during his student life. He was considered a grave threat to secular political establishment of Egypt. He was exiled from Egypt in early 1960s and could return to his country only in 1970.

Works
El-Naggar wrote a book entitled The Geological Concept of Mountains in the Qur'an (2003). It was published by New Vision when El-Naggar was the chair of geology at King Fahd University of Petroleum and Minerals in Dhahran, Saudi Arabia. This book sold fairly well, leading El-Naggar to leave teaching and become the Chairman of Committee of Scientific Notions in the Qur'an.

El-Naggar published more than 150 scientific studies and articles, none of them peer reviewed, and 45 books in Arabic, English and French. For instance, his book " The issue of Scientific Miracles in the Holy Quran", in Arabic: "قضية الإعجاز العلمي للقرآن و ضوابط التعامل معها ". Many of those publications deal with what are considered to be scientific miracles in Qur'an.

Controversial claims and religion

Naggar said that the power of America would eventually end.

Camel urine was prescribed as a treatment by Zaghloul El-Naggar which has anti cancer properties according to a peer reviewed paper.

He engaged in 9/11 denial and spoke twice in the Imam Muhammad ibn Abd al-Wahhab Mosque in Qatar.

Splitting of the moon 
Naggar claimed in 2004 that NASA had in 1978 confirmed in a television program the splitting of the moon.

See also
 Islamic attitudes towards science
 Quran and miracles
 Abdul Majeed al-Zindani
 Mohammed Rateb al-Nabulsi

References

External links
 Zaghloul El-Naggar website
 د. زغلول النجار Dr. Zaghloul Al Najjar - YouTube
 د. زغلول النجار Dr. Zaghloul Al Najjar - Facebook

1933 births
Living people
Muslim Brotherhood philosophers
Academic staff of King Fahd University of Petroleum and Minerals
Alumni of the University of Wales
Egyptian Sunni Muslim scholars of Islam
Egyptian writers
Egyptian geologists
Writers about religion and science